Sundari Neeyum Sundaran Naanum is an Indian Tamil-language television series shown on Vijay TV Monday to Saturday. It premiered on 22 July 2019 and ended on 20 March 2021 after 405 episodes. It stars Tejashwini Gowda and Vinoth Baabu.

Plot
Tamizharasi is born in a middle-class family and is raised by her widowed mother, two sisters and grandfather. She is also a teacher. She and her sisters are being raised without knowing how their father died.

Velmurugan, who is from a wealthy family aspires to be a politician has cute clashes with Tamizharasi, but they fall in love and marry.

Unknown to Velmurugan, Tamizharasi is his relative years ago before their family is rifted apart. Later, Velmurugan's grandmother learns of this and sends Tamizharasi away and is being forced by Velmurugan's relatives to divorce but she doesn't give up.

Then, because of the love she has on Velmurugan's grandmother, she gives her fertility to save Velmurugan's grandmother. The rest of the story concludes with whether Tamizharasi and Velmurugan are reuniting.

Crossover episodes
Sundari Neeyum Sundaram Naanum had a crossover with the serial Ponnuku Thanga Manasu from 27 November 2019 to 2 December 2019. They were one-hour episodes. The episodes were based on the marriage of Velu and Thamilzharasi (episodes 108-111). It was directed by Harrison, the Ponnuku Thanga Manasu director.

Cast

Main
 Tejaswini Gowda as Thamizharasi: a girl who runs schools in the villages and takes care. She is sweet. She is briefly married to Velumurgan. (2019-2021)
 Vinoth Babu as Velmurugan: aims to become a political leader; briefly married to Thamizharasi. (2019-2021)
 Latha as Vijayalakshmi, Velumurgan grandmother (episodes 1-220; 2019-2020)
Nalini Nair replaced Latha (s221-405) as Vijayalakshmi: She is Velumurgan's grandmother. She cared for him after his parents died. She was shocked when Thamizharasi married Velumurgan. She is gentle and arrogant. (2020-2021)

Supporting
Nesan as Thennarasu, Nisha's father
Ashwanth Thilak (1-325) Gve Krishna (325-405) as Saravanan, Velmurugan's best friend, Vijayalakshmi's adoptive grandson, and Ezhil's husband
 Preethi Kumar as Divya, Indrani's daughter and Vijayalakshmi's granddaughter
Kanya Bharathi as Indrani, Vijayalakshmi's daughter-in-law
Sahaana Sheety as Nisha, Thennarasu's daughter
Yaar Kannan as Sukumaran, Thamizharasi's grandfather
Seetha Anil as Chithra, Thamizharasi's mother
Priyanka as Ezhilarasi, Thamizharasi's first younger sister and Saravanan's wife
Deepika as Kalaiarasi, Thamizharasi's second younger sister
VJ Santhiya as Urvashi, Thamizharsi's maternal aunt
VJ Praveen as the lawyer Prabhakaran Thamizharasi's tenant and family friend
Ranjith as Deepak, Divya's fiancé and Indrani's business partner
Elamaran as Elamaran, Velmurugan's sidekick
Sangeetha V as Thenmozhi, Vijayalakshmi's daughter

References

External links 
 Sundari Neeyum Sundaran Naanum on Hotstar

Star Vijay original programming
2010s Tamil-language television series
Tamil-language romance television series
2019 Tamil-language television series debuts
Tamil-language television shows
2021 Tamil-language television series endings